Asociación Deportiva 9 de Julio (more often referred as 9 de Julio de Morteros) is an Argentine football club based in the city of Morteros, in the north east of the Córdoba Province, Argentina. The squad currently plays in Zone B of the regionalised 3rd level of Argentine football Torneo Federal A.

See also
List of football clubs in Argentina
Argentine football league system

External links
El 9 de Morteros 

Football clubs in Córdoba Province, Argentina
Association football clubs established in 1942
1942 establishments in Argentina